Pichak Mahalleh (also Romanized as Pīchak Maḩalleh; also known as Vashmgīr and Voshmgīr) is a village in Katul Rural District, in the Central District of Aliabad County, Golestan Province, Iran. At the 2006 census, its population was 2,304, in 554 families.

References 

Populated places in Aliabad County